LMA Manager is a football management video game series developed and published by Codemasters. Developed primarily for consoles, the franchise differs from the PC-based Football Manager and Championship Manager series by focusing on visual details such as a fully 3D match engine, although still maintaining the realism and level of detail craved by fans of the genre - a unique combination when the series was first released.

The series has different titles in different regions: LMA Manager in the UK (named after the League Managers Association), BDFL Manager in Germany (basically the German equivalent of the LMA), Manager de Liga in Spain, Football Manager Campionato in Italy, and FC Manager - La Passion du Foot in France since the 2006 edition (the French edition of the series was previously named Roger Lemerre - La Sélection des Champions after the former coach of the France national team).

LMA Manager
The first LMA Manager video game was released in 1999 for the PlayStation, featuring 8,000 players and 294 clubs in 32 countries.

LMA Manager 2001
The second LMA game was released - also on PlayStation - in March 2001. Two versions were released, one for the English leagues as before, and another specifically covering the Scottish Premier and Football Leagues. The in-match action is presented by former footballer turned BBC analyst Alan Hansen. Sometimes this version gets caught in between the retro style of the original game, and the 2002 version. Although practically the same as the 2002 version, this contains some differences in the in-match play, and is famed for wingers cutting inside to shoot from ridiculous angles, and goalkeepers who tend to tip shots just inside the far post, making this an often frustrating game. There are also a few mistakes on the game, such as Birmingham City's Bryan Hughes being 29, instead of his proper age at the time, which was 24. It is also occasional for defenders to pick up the ball in their own penalty box, and proceed to kick it out like a keeper, as well as people scoring from their kick-off.

A slight difference from the original is the length of gameplay - this version finishing after 30 seasons in football management while the previous version finished after 50 seasons.

LMA Manager 2002
LMA 2002 was the final version in the series to be released on PlayStation, launched on 2 November 2001. Although principally just an update from the 2001 version, the game did prove to be quite a stepping stone from the LMA of old and the LMA seen today.

The first PlayStation 2 incarnation went under the same name when released in April 2002. A significant update from PS1, it allowed players to manage in one of six European leagues, all of which were processed by the game simultaneously (the top two divisions in Italy, Spain, Germany and France were added, in addition to the existing top four divisions in England and Scotland). On the PS2, matches played out in full in a 3D match environment, followed by post-match highlights voiced by famous BBC presenter Gary Lineker alongside the returning Hansen. The game play advanced in this game from the 2001 version, in particular the in-match style. Players tend to shoot early, from around thirty yards, rather than enter into the penalty area.

LMA Manager 2003
Originally slated for release in October 2002, but releasing ultimately on 15 November 2002, this was the first edition to be released on Xbox, alongside the PS2 release. The version added no additional leagues and contained minor enhancements from the previous game.

LMA Manager 2004

The next in the series was released on 12 March 2004 on PS2 and Xbox, and added a variety of enhancements to the match, as well as new commentary in the post-match highlights voiced by renowned commentator Barry Davies and analysed by Lineker and Hansen as before. New 'Fantasy Team' mode (replacing the 'Challenge Mode' in earlier games) whereby users could build up a team from scratch using a preallocated budget, based loosely on the popular fantasy football game. Once the user had compiled a squad and selected a team name, stadium and kit, the newly created club would compete in one of the leagues in the game. Another new feature in this version was the option (on Xbox only) of issuing tactical instructions to your team via the Xbox Communicator headset during a match.  A second edition of the game was released, updating the squads from the January 2004 transfer window.

LMA Manager 2005
LMA 2005 was released on PS2 and Xbox on 31 October 2004, and chief amongst the enhancements was the addition of the Dutch and Portuguese leagues and English Football Conference division, the first new playable leagues to be added since 2002. Another unique feature was the option to download a mid-season player roster update via Xbox Live or the PlayStation online service, the second edition release had the updated squads by default at the expense of the online features. PS2 owners with access to an EyeToy camera could take a photo of themselves, which would appear on various newspaper articles seen in the game (for example, a celebration photo after winning a trophy, or an unhappy image after being sacked by their club).

Manchester United Manager 2005
At the same time as the normal version of LMA 2005, a special themed edition was also released on PS2 and Xbox, entitled Manchester United Manager. As the name suggests, this version was tailored around Manchester United, and contained various photos and video clips of the club. However, the game itself was unchanged from LMA, allowing players to manage any club, not just Manchester United.

LMA Professional Manager 2005
Released alongside LMA 2005 and Manchester United Manager, this version was notable for two reasons - it was the first game in the series to be released on PC, and the first developed externally (by Kuju rather than Codemasters). The change of platform required a redesigned interface, with the straightforward joypad-based navigation of PS2 replaced by a mouse-driven control system more similar to a graphical user interface such as Microsoft Windows. Each screen the user progressed to was housed on a separate window, which made finding one's way from section to section rather awkward.

Content-wise, the PC version contained the same playable leagues, 3D match engine and transfer system as the console version, although there were extra non-playable countries added from around the world to bolster the transfer market.

LMA Manager 2006
LMA 2006 was released on 18 November 2005 for PS2 and Xbox, with a further three playable divisions included from Dutch and Portuguese leagues, as well as further enhancements to the 3D match, transfer market and player training setup (including playable 3D Training Matches for the first time). In keeping with the series' visual roots, a new option allowed players to create a 3D model of their manager, who could be seen pacing along the touchlines during a match or featuring in one of the new video headlines (introducing a new transfer signing to the press, for example) included in the game world's TV station.

This game provided the most complex transfer processes yet, with the ability to swap players and give instalments. However, the game limits you to only having four transfers made via contract clauses (i.e. 10% sell on clause or £75,000 to be transferred after fifteen appearances). Using contract clauses, you can usually pick the player up for a cheaper transfer fee than what you would if you didn't use a contract clause, but after you've used all four and try to use another, it will say that the club who the player currently plays for cannot afford to let him go. Once you sell anyone you have used with a contract clause, you may then buy a player using another contract clause.

After the third-party conversion of LMA Professional Manager 2005, a second PC version was being developed by Codemasters themselves and was scheduled for release in Spring 2006 alongside the first seventh-generation iteration on Xbox 360. However, these versions' development slipped back, making LMA Manager 2007 a tri-format release.

LMA Manager 2007
This was released on 22 September 2006 on PS2, PC-DVD, and Xbox 360, with transfer updates available for download. Like other versions of the PC, it uses a graphical user interface like LMA 2005.  Its main theme is "Hands Open", by Snow Patrol. The lack of subsequent titles, and the fact that the PC version of LMA 2007 would not run on Windows Vista and Windows 7 due to its use of a StarForce DRM, and its limited availability on 7th generation games consoles, alongside the growing popularity of the Football Manager series following its successful 2006 series launch meant as of 2009 the LMA series became effectively defunct.

LMA Manager 2008 
LMA Manager 2008 was developed by Glu Mobile and released on mobile on January 23, 2008.

References

1999 video games
Association football management video games
Multiplayer hotseat games
PlayStation (console) games
PlayStation (console)-only games
PlayStation 2 games
Electronic Arts franchises
Video games developed in the United Kingdom
Video game franchises
Windows games
Xbox games
Xbox 360 games
J2ME games